Kabulwebulwe was a Nkoya kingdom in what is today Mumbwa District, Zambia.

See also
Kahare
Momba, Zambia
Mutondo

References
 State penetration and the Nkoya experience in western Zambia

History of Zambia